Drive FX is a new 24-hour music format produced by Dial Global. It targets a general radio audience between the ages of 25-49 with electronic music. This format has debut on January 6, 2009 as part of the "Dial Global Total" format lineup.

Affiliates
Drive FX can be heard on the following radio stations throughout the Hudson Valley region (Newburgh/Poughkeepsie) of New York:

WJGK 103.1 HD-2
WGNY-FM 98.9 HD-2
W239BL - 95.7
W231BP - 94.1

References

External links
Drive FX by Dial Global
Drive FX Official Website

Radio formats
American radio networks
Dance radio stations